Annisis is a genus of deep-sea bamboo coral  in the family Isididae.  It is  monotypic with a single species, Annisis sprightly.

References

Isididae
Monotypic cnidarian genera
Octocorallia genera